Norbert Supe (born 15 April 1996) is a Ghanaian professional footballer who plays as a midfielder for Ghanaian Premier League side Berekum Chelsea. He previously playing for Dormaa-based team Aduana Stars.

Career

Aduana Stars 
Supe joined Aduana Stars in October 2019 towards the start of the 2019–20 Ghana Premier League season. On 19 February 2020, he made his debut playing the full 90 minutes in a 1–0 victory over Kumasi Asante Kotoko. He went on a made 2 league appearances before it was cancelled as a result of the COVID-19 pandemic in June 2020. In November 2020, he made the team roaster for the 2020–21 season as the league was set to restart in November 2020. However he played 3 league matches before leaving the club during the second transfer period.

Berekum Chelsea 
In March 2021, Supe joined Berekum Chelsea during the second round of the transfer period after starting the season with rivals Aduana Stars. He made his debut on 11 April 2021, starting and playing the full time in a 2–0 loss to Kumasi Asante Kotoko.

References

External links 

 

Living people
1996 births
Association football midfielders
Ghanaian footballers
Aduana Stars F.C. players
Berekum Chelsea F.C. players
Ghana Premier League players